The 1965 Armstrong 500 was the sixth running of the Bathurst 500 touring car race. It was held on 3 October 1965 at the Mount Panorama Circuit just outside Bathurst, New South Wales, Australia. The race was open to Australian assembled or manufactured vehicles and, for the first time, to imported vehicles, of which at least 100 examples and 250 examples respectively had been registered in Australia. Cars competed in four classes based on the purchase price of the vehicle in Australian pounds. Prize money was on offer only for class placings however the Armstrong Trophy was presented to the entrant of the outright winning car, this being the first time in the history of the event that there had been an official award for the outright winner.

The outright winning car was the Ford Cortina Mk.I GT500 entered by Fairfield Motors and driven by Barry Seton and emerging young driver Midge Bosworth. Second was the Grawill Motors entered Cortina driven mainly by Bruce McPhee with one lap driven by Barry Mulholland. Third, and one lap behind the two Cortina was the factory entered Morris Cooper S of Brian Foley and Peter Manton.

Class structure

Class A
Class A was for cars under £920. It was contested by Datsun Bluebird, Fiat 850, 1.5 litre Ford Cortina 220, Morris Mini de Luxe and Vauxhall Viva, although all the Datsuns were withdrawn prior to race start due to wheel cracking failures.

Class B
The £921 to £1,020 class featured 1.5 litre Ford Cortina 240, Isuzu Bellett, Morris Cooper, Renault R8 and Toyota Corona.

Class C
The £1,021 to £1,300 class was dominated by the Morris Cooper S, but also contained Chrysler Valiant, Ford Cortina GT and Holden HD X2.

Class D
The £1,301 to £2,000 class featured the first of what came to be known as the 'Bathurst specials', the Ford Cortina GT500 named for the race. The class also contained Fiat 2300, Humber Vogue, Studebaker Lark, Triumph 2000 and Volvo 122.

Results

Statistics
 Fastest Lap  – #29 Brian Foley  – 3:13.7 (lap record)
 Average Speed  – 110 km/h
 Race time of first car home – 7:16:45.1

References

Further reading
 Australian Motor Manual, December 1965, page 47

External links
 1965 Armstrong 500 race summary, race results and video, www.uniquecarsandparts.com.au
 Bathurst 1965 images, autopics.com.au

Motorsport in Bathurst, New South Wales
Armstrong 500
Armstrong 500